Moez Bouakaz (born 2 December 1966 in Tunis) is a former Tunisian football midfielder.

History
Moez Bouakaz started his career as player with FC Sion in Switzerland when he was student their. In 2000 he became a manager with FC Chalais. In 2007 he travel to Algéria and started managering as Physical Fitness Coach with ES Sétif.
After managering some Swiss and Algerian clubs, he signed in June 2017 a new managerial contract with MC Oran.

References

1966 births
Living people
Tunisian footballers
Footballers from Tunis
Espérance Sportive de Tunis players
FC Sion players
Tunisian expatriate footballers
Expatriate footballers in Switzerland
Tunisian expatriate sportspeople in Switzerland
Association football midfielders
Tunisian football managers
USM Bel Abbès managers
RC Relizane managers
MC Oran managers
JSM Béjaïa managers
JS Saoura managers
CA Bordj Bou Arréridj managers
US Biskra managers
Tunisian expatriate football managers
Expatriate football managers in Algeria
Tunisian expatriate sportspeople in Algeria